Fahim Hashimi (born 27 September 1980) is an ethnic Hazara politician from Afghanistan. Between May 2019 and August 2020, Hashimy was the former Minister for Telecommunication and Information Technology. He was the second elected President of the Afghanistan Olympic Committee from 2014–2015. He had served as the acting vice-president before taking over from Mohammad Zahir Aghbar.

Early life
Fahim Hashimy was born on 27 September 1980 in Kabul, Afghanistan. He belongs to the Hazara ethnic group.

Businesses

Fahim Hashimy is one of Afghanistan's leading entrepreneurs. In 2005 he began building one of the largest logistics companies in Afghanistan, focusing on providing critical services and material resources to the Afghan Government and International Forces. In 2010 Fahim Hashimy launched, 1TV Afghanistan's second largest TV Network, the centerpiece of GroupOne, a media production and the strategic communications group MCXI. This venture is part of the Hashimy Group, an Afghan conglomerate with interests in fuel logistics, manufacturing, airlines, trading, and construction.

ANOC presidency

Hashimy was elected to a four-year term as NOC President at the ANOC General Assembly in Kabul on 30 April 2014. He secured 27 votes in the first round of voting, giving him the majority needed to be elected. He succeeded Mohammad Zahir Aghbar who served as ANOC President from 2009 to 2014.

Following his election as NOC President, Hashimy stated that he wanted "to create a world class NOC and that he also want to increase the participation of women in sports and show that culturally you can be a good Muslim woman but also a good athlete." Further he mentioned that the election was a historic day and that he now wants to take the NOC to the next level.

References

1980 births
Living people
People from Kabul
Hazara politicians